Pink Elephant or Pink Elephants may refer to:

 "Seeing pink elephants", a euphemism for a drunken hallucination
 Pink Elephant (film), a 1975 cartoon from the Pink Panther series
 Pink Elephants (film), a cartoon produced by the Terrytoons studio
 Pink Elephants, a 1997 album by Mick Harvey
 Pink Elephant (album), a 2009 album by N'dambi
 "Pink Elephant", a song by the Cherry Poppin' Daddies from Rapid City Muscle Car
 Pink Elephant (cigarette), a Dutch brand

See also 
 "Pink Elephants on Parade", a segment and a song from Dumbo
 White elephant (animal), whose actual color is pinkish